Rahman Amouzad Khalili (born 17 July 2002) is an Iranian freestyle wrestler who currently competes at 65 kilograms. One year after winning his second straight Cadet World Championship (U17), Amouzad claimed a bronze medal from the senior level 2020 Individual World Cup. In 2021, he became the Junior World Champion. In 2022, he won a gold medal at the World Wrestling Championships.

Major results

Career

2018–2019 
After winning the Cadet Iranian National championship at 45 kilograms, Amouzad claimed the Asian Continental and the World Championships in 2018. After defending titles from the Iranian Nationals and the Asian Championships now at 48 kilos, Amouzad competed at the World Championships, where he notably defeated Steven Poulin from the United States in the semifinals, and went viral when Poulin refused to shake Amouzad's hand seconds before being thrown for four points, Amouzad winning with a clean 12–0 score. After winning the World title, United World Wrestling named Amouzad the Cadet Freestyle Wrestler of the year.

2020–2021 
A two-time U17 World Champion, Amouzad joined the Islamic Azad University team at the age of 18, and made his senior level debut at 61 kilos in October 2020 competing in the Iranian Premier League, winning by technical fall over Ehsan Ranjbar and '16 University World Champion Younes Sarmasti. As a Cadet World Champion, Amouzad qualified for the Iranian World Team Trials, which were held on 5 November, where he went 1–2 at 57 kg, losing to Reza Atri, winning over Nader Hajaghania and losing to Alireza Sarlak. Mohammad Ibrahim Emami, the spokesman of the Iranian Wrestling Federation, blamed both of Amouzad's losses to referee's mistakes, stating he should have won both matches. Amouzad then competed in the returning round of the Iranian Premier League on 6 December, beating Reza Khalaghi and Erfan Jafarian. On 16 December, Amouzad competed at the Individual World Cup, claiming the bronze medal after defeating high level opponents, only losing to two-time and reigning World Champion Zaur Uguev.

On 9 March 2021, Amouzad competed against '19 Asian Continental champion Reza Atri for the Iranian Olympic Team spot, losing in a close bout on points. On 20 May, Amouzad claimed the Takhi Cup at 61 kilograms.

On August, Amouzad returned to the age-group, now in the junior level, becoming the 2021 Junior World Champion at 61 kilograms.

Freestyle record 

! colspan="7"| Senior Freestyle Matches
|-
!  Res.
!  Record
!  Opponent
!  Score
!  Date
!  Event
!  Location
|-
! style=background:white colspan=7 |
|-
|Loss
|14–5
|align=left| Toshihiro Hasegawa
|style="font-size:88%"|5–9
|style="font-size:88%" rowspan=2|2 October 2021
|style="font-size:88%" rowspan=2|2021 World Championships
|style="text-align:left;font-size:88%;" rowspan=2| Oslo, Norway
|-
|Win
|14–4
|align=left| Gamzatgadzsi Halidov
|style="font-size:88%"|5–0
|-
! style=background:white colspan=7 |
|-
|Win
|13–4
|align=left| Mohammad Ramezanpour
|style="font-size:88%"|3–1
|style="font-size:88%" rowspan=4|20 May 2021
|style="font-size:88%" rowspan=4|2021 Takhi Cup
|style="text-align:left;font-size:88%;" rowspan=4|
 Tehran, Iran
|-
|Win
|12–4
|align=left| Dariush Gholizadeh
|style="font-size:88%"|TF 11–0
|-
|Win
|11–4
|align=left| Peyman Nemati
|style="font-size:88%"|3–1
|-
|Win
|10–4
|align=left| Amir Hossein Khodabakhshi
|style="font-size:88%"|6–1
|-
! style=background:white colspan=7 |
|-
|Loss
|9–4
|align=left| Reza Atri
|style="font-size:88%"|4–6
|style="font-size:88%"|9 March 2021
|style="font-size:88%"|2021 Iranian Olympic Team Trials
|style="text-align:left;font-size:88%;"|
 Tehran, Iran
|-
! style=background:white colspan=7 |
|-
|Win
|9–3
|align=left| Uladzislau Andreyeu
|style="font-size:88%"|4–0
|style="font-size:88%" rowspan=5|16 December 2020
|style="font-size:88%" rowspan=5|2020 Individual World Cup
|style="text-align:left;font-size:88%;" rowspan=5|
 Belgrade, Serbia
|-
|Loss
|8–3
|align=left| Zaur Uguev
|style="font-size:88%"|Fall
|-
|Win
|8–2
|align=left| Diamantino Iuna Fafé
|style="font-size:88%"|Fall
|-
|Win
|7–2
|align=left| Givi Davidovi
|style="font-size:88%"|TF 11–0
|-
|Win
|6–2
|align=left| Saban Kiziltas
|style="font-size:88%"|TF 10–0
|-
! style=background:white colspan=7 |
|-
|Win
|5–2
|align=left| Erfan Jafarian
|style="font-size:88%"|11–2
|style="font-size:88%" rowspan=2|6 December 2020
|style="font-size:88%" rowspan=2|2020 Iranian Premier League
|style="text-align:left;font-size:88%;" rowspan=2|
 Tehran, Iran
|-
|Win
|4–2
|align=left| Reza Khalaghi
|style="font-size:88%"|TF 10–0
|-
! style=background:white colspan=7 |
|-
|Loss
|3–2
|align=left| Alireza Sarlak
|style="font-size:88%"|8–10
|style="font-size:88%" rowspan=3|5 November 2020
|style="font-size:88%" rowspan=3|2020 Iranian World Team Trials
|style="text-align:left;font-size:88%;" rowspan=3|
 Tehran, Iran
|-
|Win
|3–1
|align=left| Nader Hajaghania
|style="font-size:88%"|FF
|-
|Loss
|2–1
|align=left| Reza Atri
|style="font-size:88%"|4–4
|-
! style=background:white colspan=7 |
|-
|Win
|2–0
|align=left| Younes Sarmasti
|style="font-size:88%"|TF 10–0
|style="font-size:88%" rowspan=2|2 October 2020
|style="font-size:88%" rowspan=2|2020 Iranian Premier League
|style="text-align:left;font-size:88%;" rowspan=2|
 Tehran, Iran
|-
|Win
|1–0
|align=left| Ehsan Ranjbar
|style="font-size:88%"|TF 12–2
|-

External links

References 

Living people
2002 births
Iranian male sport wrestlers
People from Behshahr
Asian Wrestling Championships medalists
Sportspeople from Mazandaran province
21st-century Iranian people
World Wrestling Champions